Mucilaginibacter galii is a Gram-negative, non-spore-forming and rod-shaped bacterium from the genus of Mucilaginibacter which has been isolated from leaves of the plant Galium album.

References

External links
Type strain of Mucilaginibacter galii at BacDive -  the Bacterial Diversity Metadatabase

Sphingobacteriia
Bacteria described in 2017